Ian Danney (born 30 December 1969) is a Canadian former bobsledder. He competed in the four man event at the 1998 Winter Olympics.

References

External links
 

1969 births
Living people
Canadian male bobsledders
Olympic bobsledders of Canada
Bobsledders at the 1998 Winter Olympics
Sportspeople from Georgetown, Guyana
Guyanese emigrants to Canada